Hiền Lương Bridge is a bridge over Bến Hải River, Vĩnh Linh District, Quảng Trị Province, North Central Coast, Việt Nam. This bridge is located in 17th Parallel and in Vietnam War, it was bisected between South Vietnam and North Vietnam from 1954 to 1976. American bombs destroyed the first Hien Luong Bridge in 1967 and again destroyed it in 1970.

History
Hien Luong bridge, being located at the military border of the war, witnessed symbolic and propaganda conflicts between the two sides of the war. Both the Saigon regime and the Democratic Republic of Vietnam deployed huge speakers with high power to broadcast their message as far as possible. Moreover, whenever the Saigon regime repaint their part of the bridge with a new color, the Democratic Republic of Vietnam also repainted their part with the very same color, to signify DRV's will to unify of Vietnam nation.

Both sides also built massive flag poles in a race of size and height, resulted at a victory of the Democratic Republic of Vietnam with a 38.6 metre height pole. Unable to win the battle of size, the Saigon regime attempted to destroy the opponent flag by intense airstrikes and naval bombardment. Later during the 1965-68 American bombardment against Democratic Republic of Vietnam, the DRV flags was also targeted many times by American airstrikes. The 1967 bombing destroyed both the bridge and the flag pole. DRV responded by rebuilt a new temporary flag pole every time the old one was destroyed. Sewing machines were send to the frontline to reduce the required manufacture time. Local people also assisted the sewing, with two women named Trần Thị Viễn and Ngô Thị Diễm was awarded the title of Hero for their significant contribution to the task.

In 1973, an iron girder bridge was built and reopened following reunification in 1975. The current bridge was built in 1999.

References

Buildings and structures in Quảng Trị province
Bridges in Vietnam